Frostbite is a fictional character from the G.I. Joe: A Real American Hero toyline, comic books and animated series. He is the G.I. Joe Team's Snow Cat driver and debuted in 1985.

Profile
His real name is Farley S. Seward, and his rank is that of corporal E-4. Frostbite was born in Galena, Alaska. All file cards as of 2005 list Frostbites rank as Sergeant E-5 except for his Rise of Cobra figure that lists his rank as Classified.

Frostbite's primary military specialty is motor vehicle driver, and his secondary military specialty is armor. He worked briefly as a lineman on the Alaska pipeline, but considered the job unchallenging, despite the 40 below zero temperatures and hazardous conditions. He joined the Army, when they promised to give him a challenge whenever he wanted one. Frostbite graduated from transportation school at Fort Eustis and armored school at Fort Knox. He is a qualified expert in the M-16, M-1911A1, M-2 50 cal. machine gun, and M-60 7.62mm machine gun. His real name is an in-joke to "Seward's Folly", a reference to Alaska.

Frostbite's driving ability earned him a spot as the primary driver of the G.I. Joe Snow Cat. Though he prefers frigid conditions, Frostbite has served on missions in a variety of combat situations, driving several different vehicles. When the G.I. Joe team temporarily disbanded, Frostbite returned to the Army at the Fort Greely Cold Regions Test Center. He returned to the team upon reinstatement as their primary cold weather trooper should the need arise.

Toys
Frostbite was first released as an action figure in 1985, packaged with the "Snow Cat" arctic assault half-track vehicle. The figure was repainted and released as part of the "Tiger Force" line in 1988, packaged with the "Tiger Cat" covert assault half-track. A new version of Frostbite was released in 1993, as part of the "Battle Corps" line.

In 2002, Frostbite was released as part of a two-pack with a Neo-Viper figure. The filecard explains Frostbite carries a grudge against the Neo-Viper troops for harming arctic lands. A recolored version of this Frostbite was included with the Joe vehicle 'Rockslide' in the same year.

A version of Frostbite with no accessories came with the Built to Rule Forest Fox, which followed the G.I. Joe: Spy Troops storyline. The forearms and the calves of the figure sported places where blocks could be attached.

Further versions of the character were released in 2003, 2004, 2005, 2006, and 2009. The G.I. Joe Collector's Club also released two versions in 2015 based on the original and Tiger Force figures.

Comics

Marvel Comics
In the Marvel Comics G.I. Joe series, he first appeared in issue #64. He also appears in issue #68. He is one of many Joes, including Back-Stop, Duke, Iceberg and Cover Girl, sent in to protect Battleforce 2000. Artificially induced anger ends with the Joes trapped on the ice and under Cobra fire. Battleforce 2000 saves all them from certain death by destroying a missile barrage.

Frostbite is in command during a mission to Alaska's Bering Strait. He is sent in with Avalanche and Snow Job to investigate Cobra and Russian movement in the area. The trio also have to deal with the Russians' answer to the G.I. Joe team, the Oktober Guard.

Action Force
Frostbite appears in two issues of the UK 'Action Force' series. He and Footloose fight Cobra forces. Frostbite is injured in an explosion but survives.

Devil's Due
Frostbite appears in the two Devil's Due Joe series. In A Real American Hero he is part of a team assigned to steal back nuclear bombs Cobra was carrying. Or so they believe. In G.I. Joe Frontlines, he is sent in with Duke, Lifeline and other Joes to investigate a mysterious Arctic base that was once infested with humanoid monsters. It is again infested, endangering the entire team. The monsters are capable of passing their condition to others. The Joes manage to safely escape with the rescue of a civilian.

Animated series

Sunbow
Frostbite first appeared in the G.I. Joe first-season episode "Three Cubes to Darkness". He was a minor character in the series, and was voiced by Chris Latta.

Valor vs. Venom
Frostbite appeared in the direct-to-video CGI animated movie G.I. Joe: Valor vs. Venom, voiced by Louis Chirillo.

Renegades
Frostbite appears in the G.I. Joe: Renegades episode "White Out." He is seen in a flashback where he was a teammate of Snow Job and Tunnel Rat. During an unsanctioned skiing trip with Snow Job, both of them got caught in an avalanche. Snow Job emerged from the snow, but Frostbite didn't.

References

External links
 Frostbite at JMM's G.I. Joe Comics Home Page

Fictional characters from Alaska
Fictional corporals
Fictional military sergeants
Fictional drivers
Fictional United States Army personnel
G.I. Joe soldiers
Male characters in animated series
Male characters in comics
Television characters introduced in 1985